The effects of Climate change in Florida is attributable to man-made increases in atmospheric carbon dioxide. Floridians are experiencing increased flooding due to sea level rise, and are concerned about the possibility of more frequent or more intense hurricanes.

The state has been described as America's "ground zero" for climate change, global warming and sea level rise, because "the majority of its population and economy is concentrated along low-elevation oceanfront."

Florida residents think climate change is happening at higher rates than the national average. However, only a slim majority agree it is anthropogenic in nature. Some communities in Florida have begun implementing climate change mitigation approaches; however, statewide initiatives have been hampered by the politicization of climate change in the United States, focusing on resilience rather than full scale mitigation and adaptation.

Impact of sea level rise 

Flooding during high tides occurs in Miami Beach. The city is spending $500M on elevated roadways, seawalls, and pumping systems, as part of its Sea Level Rise Strategy. GIS mapping of areas subject to flooding during high tides, storm surges, and major storm events is available.
 
In Key Largo and Big Pine Key, $517,000 is being spent to raise one mile of roads, as a "Sea Level Rise Pilot Project".

A "Sea Level Scenario Sketch Planning Tool is used by the Florida Department of Transportation, MPOs, local governments, and regional planning agencies to assess potential impacts of sea level rise (SLR) on transportation facilities."

Coastal protection, including beach renourishment, has been a focus of state government.

A 2018 Florida International University study says that sea level rise will inundate the mangroves of the Florida Everglades. The stored carbon in the Everglades has been valued at between $2 billion and $3.4 billion. "As the ocean pushes westward and north into the Everglades and the Biscayne Aquifer," the water supply of Miami will be impacted. The loss of mangroves and wetlands due to sea level rise will also impact commercial fisheries.

A 2017 study by Cornell University researchers says "nearly two million Floridians will be forced from their homes by 2100 because of climate-induced rising seas."

Impact of climate change on Florida hurricanes 
A change in hurricane frequency or intensity is of concern for Floridians. The Climate Change Center at Florida State University and Climate.gov say the science is inconclusive regarding hurricane frequency or intensity. However, rainfall rates will increase according to most climate models, and the storm surge associated with hurricanes will increase with rising sea levels.

After Hurricane Irma in 2017, which occurred just weeks after Hurricane Harvey, Governor Rick Scott did not attribute the possible changes in hurricane patterns to climate change.

There is some evidence that hurricanes may slow down their rate of forward advance, like Hurricane Dorian, which spent a day and a half over Grand Bahama Island on its way to Florida.

A category 5 hurricane is of most concern in the Tampa Bay area, and climate related sea level rise of as little as six inches would exacerbate its impact.

State climate change policy 

The Florida Climate Protection Act of 2008 created the Florida Energy and Climate Commission. It also urged the Department of Environmental Protection to develop a greenhouse gas reduction strategy.

Governor Charlie Crist signed several executive orders related to climate change upon taking office. These executive orders included tailpipe emission limits for cars sold in Florida, called for reductions in the state's greenhouse gas emissions, and mandated a minimum of 20 percent renewable energy by 2020 for Florida's electric utilities. The Public Service Commission rejected six new coal-fired power plants under Crist.

Governor Rick Scott "denied the idea of anthropogenic global warming" during his first election in 2010. Use of the term "climate change" was discouraged during his administration. He also eliminated mandates to reduce greenhouse gas emissions and appointed climate skeptics to posts such as the Public Service Commission. Scott vetoed $750,000 budgeted for pumping water out of Miami Beach, on the grounds that the money didn't provide "a clear statewide return for the investment," and did not reply directly when asked if he would support efforts to protect Miami's water supply. Scott was sued by a group of children aged 10–20 for his positions on climate.

Governor Ron DeSantis established an Office of Resiliency and Coastal Protection. DeSantis was noted for actually speaking the word "climate change" in his statement: "This idea of – quote – 'climate change' has become politicized. My environmental policy is just to try to do things that benefit Floridians." However, DeSantis has not make climate mitigation, renewable energy, or greenhouse gas reduction a policy priority. In January 2020, DeSantis was given a D grade by the Sierra Club of Florida "for his work on environmental protection and sustainability."

Florida's Republican candidates in local, state, and national office have emphasized risk mitigation and resilience for dealing with climate-related impacts, rather than climate mitigation efforts to prevent climate change.

By contrast, South Florida Republicans, such as Miami-Dade County Mayor Carlos Giménez, Representative Carlos Curbelo, and former Representative Ileana Ros-Lehtinen, have said that "man-made climate change is real and needs to be taken seriously."

Florida State Senator José Javier Rodriguez has attempted to draw attention to the problem of sunny day flooding by wearing black rainboots during legislative sessions.

Polls show that 66% to 80% percent of Floridians think that climate change is occurring.

Impact on transportation 

The Florida Department of Transportation has studied how to use greenhouse gas calculation tools as part of the transportation planning processes, and analyzes transportation infrastructure for impacts of sea level rise.

Impact on mangroves 

Mangroves are threatened in the Everglades, due to sea level rise. However, the range of mangroves is extending northwards as storms spread the mangrove seed-like propagules. There has been no hard freeze that kills mangroves in Northeast Florida for 30 years.

Mangroves are especially important for carbon sequestration, and have been referred to as "blue carbon." The stored carbon in the mangroves of the Everglades has been estimated to be worth between $2 billion and $3.4 billion.

Mangroves are also useful for flood control and storm protection. At the Tolomato Matanzas Research Reserve, mangroves create a flood barrier during storms, thereby protecting trees. Mangroves also produce soil, which helps maintain the height of the coastline.

Economically destructive red tides are expected to continue as a result of pollution and warming water.

Impact of climate change on real estate in coastal areas 

In 2017, the real estate website Zillow wrote that if climate predictions were correct, by 2100 "One in eight Florida homes would be under water, accounting for nearly half of the lost housing value nationwide." This calculation was based on comparing NOAA maps for a 6-foot sea level rise with the Zillow database of homes.

Real estate website Curbed has presented a table with impacted cities in Florida, homes at risk, and dollar estimates. Curbed has estimated that "Roughly 64,000 homes—including 12,000 in Miami Beach, a nexus of real estate investment—will face chronic flooding," and has described how changes are needed in National Flood Insurance Program. AP cites data from climate risk analytics firm Jupiter Intelligence indicating that "extreme flooding could go from affecting 5% to 86% of Miami-Dade's residential real estate supply by 2030."

A 2018 report by the Union of Concerned Scientists, titled: Underwater: Rising Seas, Chronic Floods, and the Implications for US Coastal Real Estate stated that Florida is the state with the most homes at risk from climate change: "about 1 million homes (more than 10% of the state's current residential properties)."

Officials in the Florida Keys found that it would take 75 million dollars to save three miles of road serving about two dozen homes. A December 2019 New York Times article describing the decisions facing Monroe County was titled, "Florida Keys Deliver a Hard Message: As Seas Rise, Some Places Can't Be Saved." Some small islands in the Keys may disappear altogether.

Climate gentrification is increasing real estate values in parts of Miami that are at higher elevation, and decreasing values in lower-elevation areas. By 2017, two poor black neighborhoods of Miami which are located on higher ground, Little Haiti and Liberty City, started becoming more attractive to investors. Home prices appreciated more slowly in 2018 in Miami Beach and lower-lying areas of Miami-Dade County.

One flood assessment company describes the South Florida housing market as being kept afloat by "systemic fraudulent nondisclosure" of flood risks to property. A bill passed by the US House of Representatives to require real estate agents to disclose flood risks had not made it through the Senate as of February 2019.

Climate change education 

Florida's climate change education standard states: "Identify, analyze, and relate the internal (earth system) and external (astronomical) conditions that contribute to global climate change."  The standard falls short of the Next Generation Science Standards, which have been adopted by 20 states and the District of Columbia. The human-caused elements of climate change and role of human activity are treated "as an aside," according to a leader with the Alliance for Climate Education.

Local climate mitigation efforts 
Miami-Dade County has built seawalls, implemented an Urban  Reduction Plan, and participates in the South Florida Regional Climate Compact. Miami Mayor Francis Suarez has pledged to make the city carbon neutral by 2050.

Pensacola has formed a Climate Mitigation and Adaptation Task Force which meets monthly.

Orlando Mayor Buddy Dyer was "one of the nation's first mayors to sign onto the Climate Mayors' Pledge." Orlando plans to convert its city vehicle fleet to alternative fuels by 2030.

Sarasota's Climate Adaption and Mitigation Center has been funded to work on "a curated database of peer-reviewed science to inform decision-making in academia, government and the private sector."

In North Central Florida, where climate change denial is stronger, climate change efforts were starting to be visible in 2020 in Gainesville, Alachua County, St. Augustine and Jacksonville.

In Broward County's Oakland Park, drainage installed with a FEMA Hazard Mitigation Grant prevented damage to 400 homes during Hurricane Irma.

Coral Gables Mayor Jim Cason has said, "We're working hard to create solutions until we inevitably must retreat."

South Florida climate adaptation strategies

Climate journalism 
The South Florida Sun Sentinel, Miami Herald and Palm Beach Post, along with WLRN Public Media, have formed a collaboration to cover climate change issues. The collaboration provides news and feature coverage, and a website created by its editorial boards titled: The Invading Sea, Florida and the Climate Crisis.

Southeast Florida Regional Climate Compact 
The Southeast Florida Regional Climate Compact is a partnership between Broward, Miami-Dade, Monroe, and Palm Beach Counties. Its goal is "to work collaboratively to reduce greenhouse gas emissions, implement adaptation strategies, and build climate resilience."

Integrative Collaborative on Climate and Energy (ICCE) 
The Florida Center for Environmental Studies at Florida Atlantic University has formed an Integrative Collaborative on Climate and Energy (ICCE) focused on issues of climate adaptation in Florida's urban and natural systems. Partners include the Florida Climate Initiative, the University of South Florida, and various government agencies.

Miami-Dade County Climate Programs 
Miami has been described as "ground zero" for climate change and sea level rise." The Miami-Dade County Office of Resilience has implemented climate programs and a Climate Action Plan, and there is a Sea Level Rise Committee. Protecting the water supply and the Biscayne Aquifer is a priority.

See also
 Environment of Florida
 Climate change in the United States
 List of U.S. states and territories by carbon dioxide emissions
 Plug-in electric vehicles in Florida

References

Further reading
 —this chapter of the National Climate Assessment covers Southeast states (Virginia, West Virginia, North Carolina, South Carolina, Florida, Georgia, Alabama, Tennessee, Arkansas, Louisiana).

External links 
Florida Climate Institute
The Invading Sea, Florida and the Climate Crisis

Miami-Dade County Flood Zones GIS Tool

Environment of Florida
Climate change in the United States
Climate change in the United States by state